The 2020 Voyager Media Awards were announced online on 22 May 2020. The ceremony was held online because of restrictions due to the COVID-19 pandemic.

References 

New Zealand awards
Journalism awards
2020 in New Zealand
Mass media in New Zealand
May 2020 events in New Zealand